Usuv Beg or Usub Bek Temuryants (died on January 12, 1934) was a Yezidi from Armenia and a member of the parliament of the First Republic of Armenia, a major political, national, and a military leader. Since 1896 he had been a leader of the Yazidis of Transcaucasia. Usuv Beg also participated in the Battle of Sardarabad in 1918.

In a letter from Usuv Beg to the Emperor of Russia from the Romanov dynasty, Usuv Beg wrote that his people are Yezidi Kurds. He indicates his ethnicity as Kurdish, but specifies that they are Yezidi by religion:

"I am happy on behalf of 3,000 Families of Yezidi-Kurds, Who 60 years ago, led by my Grandfather Temur Agha, left Turkey and sought refuge in Russia[.] I would like to express my gratitude and wish success to you and your family[.] We live very well on earth and under your rule."

In 2007, a school in the village of Shamiram was named in honor of Usuv Beg.

References

19th-century births
1934 deaths
Year of birth unknown
First Republic of Armenia
Armenian Yazidis
Armenian politicians
Armenian military personnel of the Turkish–Armenian War